Alan Jacobs (born 1958) is a scholar of English literature and a literary critic. He is a distinguished professor of the humanities in the honors program of Baylor University.

Career

Jacobs earned a Bachelor of Arts degree from the University of Alabama in 1980 and a Doctor of Philosophy degree from the University of Virginia in 1987.  He was the Clyde S. Kilby chair professor of English at Wheaton College (Illinois) until 2012 when his hiring to Baylor was widely noted as part of the competition between these two Christian colleges.

In addition to his academic work and books, Jacobs has been a regular contributor to magazines including The Atlantic, First Things, and The New Atlantis.

Jacobs is an evangelical Anglican.

Books
Jacobs' books include:
Breaking Bread with the Dead: A Reader's Guide to a More Tranquil Mind (Penguin Press, 2020)
The Year of Our Lord 1943: Christian Humanism in an Age of Crisis (Oxford, 2018)
How to Think: A Survival Guide for a World at Odds (Currency, 2017)
"The Book of Common Prayer": A Biography (Lives of Great Religious Books, Princeton, 2013)
The Pleasures of Reading in an Age of Distraction (Oxford, 2011)
Wayfaring: Essays Pleasant and Unpleasant (Eerdmans, 2010)
Original Sin: A Cultural History (HarperOne, 2008)
Looking Before and After: Testimony and the Christian Life (Eerdmans, 2008)
The Narnian: The Life and Imagination of C. S. Lewis (Harper, 2005)
Shaming the Devil: Essays in Truthtelling (Eerdmans, 2004)
Must Christianity Be Violent? Reflections on History, Practice, and Theology (ed. with Kenneth R. Chase, Brazos Press, 2003)
A Theology of Reading: The Hermeneutics of Love (Westview Press, 2001)
A Visit to Vanity Fair: Moral Essays on the Present Age (Brazos Press, 2001)
What Became of Wystan? Change and Continuity in Auden's Poetry (University of Arkansas, 1998)

References

External links
 

1958 births
Living people
21st-century American Episcopalians
21st-century American male writers
21st-century American non-fiction writers
21st-century evangelicals
American academics of English literature
American evangelicals
American literary critics
American magazine writers
American male non-fiction writers
Anglican scholars
Baylor University faculty
Evangelical Anglicans
Evangelical writers
Place of birth missing (living people)
University of Alabama alumni
University of Virginia alumni
Wheaton College (Illinois) faculty